Richard Henry Marx (April 12, 1924 – August 12, 1997) was an American jazz pianist and arranger. He also composed for film, television, and commercials.

Personal life
Marx and wife Ruth (née Guildoo) had a son, Richard Marx, pop singer, songwriter, and record producer. Marx also had two daughters, Nancy and Judy, and a son, Jim, from a previous marriage. He was of German Jewish descent.

Career
Marx played piano in childhood. He got his professional start playing in nightclubs in Chicago. In the 1950s, he accompanied singer Helen Merrill and released several albums.

Beginning in the 1960s, he spent three decades in advertising, writing commercial jingles for Dial soap, Kellogg's Raisin Bran cereal, Ken-L Ration dog food, Nestle's Crunch candy bars, Arm & Hammer baking soda, Virginia Slims cigarettes, La Choy Chinese food, the Chicago Blackhawks hockey team and many more. His son Richard and wife Ruth sang on some of the commercials. In the 1980s he moved to Los Angeles and composed music for the films  A League of Their Own and Edwards and Hunt and the television program Fudge. He died in Highland Park, Illinois, from injuries caused by a car accident in Las Vegas.

Discography

As leader
 Too Much Piano (Brunswick, 1955)
 Dick Marx Piano (Coral, 1957)
 Marx Makes Broadway with Buddy Collette (VSOP, 1957)
 Delicate Savagery (Coral, 1958)
You Haven't Seen the USA Until You've Seen Chicago! (DMA, 1968) written by Dick Marx, Paul Severson & Eric Stigler

As sideman or guest musician
With Johnny Frigo
 I Love John Frigo...He Swings (Mercury, 1957)

With Eddie Harris
 Eddie Harris Goes to the Movies (Vee-Jay, 1962)

With Helen Merrill
 The Nearness of You (EmArcy, 1958)

With Ken Nordine
 Word Jazz (Dot, 1957)
 Son of Word Jazz (Dot, 1958)
 Love Words (Dot, 1958)
 Next! (Dot, 1959)

With others
 1957 The Singing Reed, Lucy Reed
 1987 Richard Marx, Richard Marx
 1992 S'Wonderful, George Gershwin
 1992 The Gershwin Songbook: 'S Wonderful, George Gershwin
 1995 Pee Wee King and His Golden West Cowboys, Pee Wee King & His Golden West Cowboys
 1995 The Complete Gershwin Songbooks, George Gershwin
 1997 America's Song Butchers: The Weird World of Homer & Jethro, Homer and Jethro
 2006 Blue Suede Shoes: Gonna Shake This Shack Tonight, Pee Wee King

As arranger or conductor
 1989 Repeat Offender, Richard Marx
 1994 Have a Little Faith, Joe Cocker
 1996 Kissing Rain, Roch Voisine
 1997 Across from Midnight, Joe Cocker
 1997 Flesh & Bone, Richard Marx
 1993 Art Of Life, X Japan

References 

1924 births
1997 deaths
American film score composers
American jazz pianists
American male pianists
Richard Marx
20th-century classical musicians
20th-century American composers
20th-century American pianists
American male film score composers
American male jazz musicians
Road incident deaths in Illinois
20th-century American male musicians